Paul Spencer Graves (born 1982) is an American lawyer and politician. A Republican, he served in the Washington House of Representatives, for the 5th Legislative District.

Early life, education, and career
Graves worked as an attorney at Perkins Coie LLP.

Washington House of Representatives
Graves ran for the House seat following the announcement of the retirement of Representative Chad Magendanz. Graves defeated Darcy Burner in the general election in 2016.

In the legislature, Graves is known for sponsoring legislation that would make the records of the legislature public.

See also

References

1982 births
Living people
Republican Party members of the Washington House of Representatives
21st-century American politicians
People from Fall City, Washington
Washington (state) lawyers
People associated with Perkins Coie